Isonandra stocksii is a species of plant in the family Sapotaceae. It is endemic to India.  It is threatened by habitat loss.

References

Flora of India (region)
stocksii
Endangered plants
Taxonomy articles created by Polbot